Agúzate (Hurry Up) is an album released in 1970 by the salsa music duet Richie Ray & Bobby Cruz. The album was critically and commercially successful, having two huge radio hits: the title track and "Amparo Arrebato", a song about the Colombian dancer of the same name. Other tracks received significant radio airplay ("Vive Feliz", "Guaguancó Raro", "Traigo de Todo", "A Mi Manera") even in a time when radio broadcasting available for salsa music was very limited.

Track listing

References

1970 albums
Richie Ray & Bobby Cruz albums
Spanish-language albums